Senator Wyman may refer to:

Alfred Lee Wyman (1874–1953), South Dakota State Senate
Louis C. Wyman (1917–2002), U.S. Senator from New Hampshire for three days in 1974 and 1975
Phil Wyman (1945–2019), California State Senate